Andrew Durant (born August 2, 1985)is a footballer who is currently playing for TT Pro League team North East Stars.

International career
Durant is member of the Guyana national football team.

References

1985 births
Living people
Sportspeople from Georgetown, Guyana
Guyanese footballers
Guyana international footballers
North East Stars F.C. players
Guyanese expatriate sportspeople in Trinidad and Tobago
Tobago United F.C. players
Expatriate footballers in Trinidad and Tobago
TT Pro League players
Association football goalkeepers